Vladimir Bakarić (8 March 1912 – 16 January 1983) was a Yugoslav and Croatian communist revolutionary and a politician.

Bakarić helped to organise the partisan resistance in the Independent State of Croatia during World War II. From 1948 to 1969, he was the chairman of the League of Communists of Croatia and as such was a close collaborator of President Josip Broz Tito. Even after stepping down from the top post in communist hierarchy in the Socialist Republic of Croatia, he retained much influence and was even considered to be the most influential politician in Croatia.

From 1964 to 1974, he was a member of the Council of the Federation, and since 1974 he has been a member of the Presidency of the SFRY, where he served as vice president from May 15, 1975 to May 15, 1976, and was re-elected to that position in May 1982.

Together with Edvard Kardelj, he belonged to the more liberal wing of the Yugoslav political elite and was known for his statement on the need to "federate the federation" (federiranje federacije), a reference to the struggle between Yugoslav unitarists, who advocated giving more powers to the central government, and federalists, who wanted to shift power to the republics. However, Bakarić was usually extremely careful in his public pronouncements on policy and wary of radical statements.

See also 
 Socialist Federal Republic of Yugoslavia

References

1912 births
1983 deaths
People from Velika Gorica
People from the Kingdom of Croatia-Slavonia
League of Communists of Croatia politicians
Presidents of the Parliament of the Socialist Republic of Croatia
Prime Ministers of Croatia
Yugoslav Partisans members
Croatian people of World War II
Members of the Academy of Sciences and Arts of Bosnia and Herzegovina
Members of the Croatian Academy of Sciences and Arts
Recipients of the Order of the People's Hero
Burials at Mirogoj Cemetery
Presidency of the Socialist Federal Republic of Yugoslavia members
Members of the Federal Council for Protection of the Constitutional Order (Yugoslavia)
Recipients of the Order of the Hero of Socialist Labour